The Lex Street massacre is the name, given by a Philadelphia Daily News reporter, to a mass murder that took place in Philadelphia, Pennsylvania, United States on December 28, 2000. It was the deadliest mass murder in Philadelphia history. Ten people were shot in a crack house in the 800 block of Lex Street in West Philadelphia. Seven of them died.

Suspects 
The murders received substantial public attention, and four suspects, Jermel Lewis, Sacon Youk, Hezekiah Thomas and Quiante Perrin, were quickly charged. However, there was insufficient evidence for prosecution, and after 18 months in jail, charges were dropped. The men later sued for wrongful arrests, and eventually received a $1.9 million settlement from the city. In 2002, four different men were charged in the case, brothers Dawud and Khalid Faruqi who denied being involved in the murder, and Shihean Black and Bruce Veney, who pleaded guilty. All four were later convicted. The prosecution made a plea deal with the brothers: They were given life sentences rather than the death penalty. Black is serving multiple life terms, and Veney was sentenced to 15 to 30 years in exchange for testifying against the other three suspects, he drove the suspects to the scene but did not actually involve himself in the shooting.

Cause 
Originally, police had thought the shooting was due to a drug turf war, but in 2002 when the four guilty men were arrested it was revealed that the issue was over a car. Black told police that he had traded a Chevrolet Corsica along with $300, for Porter's (one of the victims) Dodge Intrepid. Porter did not know how to use the Corsica's stick shift and blew out the clutch. After these issues Porter went to Dawud Faruqi who had traded a pistol for the Dodge Intrepid. Porter wanted his Dodge back, but refused to pay for the damaged clutch on the Corsica. Reportedly, Porter took his car back the next day with an extra set of keys. It was this bad car deal that led to the shooting on December 28. Black told police that the night of the massacre was meant to gather or corral the victims, but when Dawud's mask fell off they began shooting to protect his identity. In the end, seven were dead and three were injured.

2007 book 
The mass shooting was explored in a 2007 book titled The Lex Street Massacre: The True Story of the Worst Mass Murder in Philadelphia History, by Antonne Jones. Jones took time studying and investigating the case to create his book which includes interviews from judges, lawyers, and even from the men convicted. This non-fiction work goes through the suspense of the case from the first wrongful convictions to the eventual imprisonment of the murderers. The book has interviews with Shihean Black who mentions the effects that living in decaying projects of Philadelphia had on him, and lead to his loss of respect for life and its value. This novel explores the causes, effects, and the importance of the massacre.

References

External links

2000 mass shootings in the United States
2000 murders in the United States
2000s crimes in Pennsylvania
2000 in Philadelphia
2000s trials
20th-century mass murder in the United States
Attacks in the United States in 2000
Attacks on buildings and structures in 2000
Massacres in 2000
Attacks on buildings and structures in the United States
Crimes in Philadelphia
Deaths by firearm in Pennsylvania
December 2000 crimes
December 2000 events in the United States
Mass murder in Pennsylvania
Mass murder in the United States
Mass shootings in Pennsylvania
Mass shootings in the United States
Massacres in the United States
Murder trials
21st-century American trials